Povilas Bartušis (born 1 September 1993) is a Lithuanian male badminton player.

Achievements

BWF International Challenge/Series
Men's Doubles

 BWF International Challenge tournament
 BWF International Series tournament
 BWF Future Series tournament

References

External links
 

1993 births
Living people
People from Tauragė
Lithuanian male badminton players
European Games competitors for Lithuania
Badminton players at the 2015 European Games